Northeast High School is a high school in Oakland Park, Florida. The school is a part of the Broward County Public Schools district.

Northeast High School is an all magnet school with three specialties: Biotechnology, Latin and Alternative Energy. All students must choose one of the three magnet programs to enroll in, and this determines several courses that the students will take.

It serves: much of Oakland Park, Sea Ranch Lakes, a portion of Lauderdale-by-the-Sea, sections of Fort Lauderdale, a portion of Tamarac, and a portion of North Lauderdale east of Florida's Turnpike.

Demographics 
As of the 2021-22 school year, the total student enrollment was 1,587. The ethnic makeup of the school was 18.9% White, 43.9% Hispanic, 33.6% Black, 1.3% Asian, 2.5% Multiracial, 0.8% Native American or Native Alaskan, and 0.1% Native Hawaiian or Pacific Islander.

FCAT scores 
Northeast High has received FCAT school grades of:

"A" - 2009-2010 academic year
"A" - 2008-2009 academic year
"A" - 2007-2008 academic year
"A" - 2006-2007 academic year
"A" - 2005-2006 academic year
"A" - 2004-2005 academic year
"A" - 2003-2004 academic year
"A" - 2002-2003 academic year

Awards 
In February 2007, Dr. Sandy Melillo, an English and TV Production teacher at Northeast, was named Broward County's 2008 Teacher of the Year and state finalist. In 2009, she moved to Pompano Beach High School, where she teaches now.

In 2007, Northeast was awarded a GOLDEN SCHOOL AWARD from the State of Florida Commissioner of Education Jeanine Blomberg. This award was given in recognition of the leadership and support rendered to the school volunteer program.

Notable alumni 
 Briana Williams - 2020 Tokyo Olympics Gold Medalist - Track & Field
 Mike Mularkey - former NFL player and coach.
 Stacy Coley - Wide Receiver for the Minnesota Vikings
 Jaco Pastorius - Jazz bassist and composer
 Brent Jett - astronaut
 Margaret Whitton - Film and television actor
 Derrick Roberson - former NFL cornerback
 Brian Drahman - Former professional baseball player (Chicago White Sox, Florida Marlins)
 Walter Salas-Humara and Bob Rupe - co-founded the rock band The Silos

Clubs 
Northeast High School has a myriad of clubs such as:

 Anime Club
 Art
 Band
 Jazz Band
 Drama
 Ecology Club
 First Priority
 Human Relations Council
 Humane Society
 AFJROTC
 Key Club
 Latin Club
 National Honor Society
 Mu Alpha Theta
 SECME: Science, Engineering, Communication, Mathematics Enrichment
Junior Academy of Science
 Robotics club
 Newspaper
 Yearbook
 Debate
 Esports
 Dungeons and Dragons
 United Notes Club

Air Force Junior ROTC 
In 1991, Northeast High School's Air Force JROTC unit, Florida-822, won first place overall at the Florida State Drill Team & Color Guard meet hosted at Patrick Air Force Base led by Cadet Colonel Kevin Croyle (Drill Team Commander) and Cadet Captain John Osorio (Color Guard Commander). Earlier in the same school year, Florida-822 won its first ever first place overall by winning the Lake Worth High School Regional Drill Meet. To finish out the school year the unit went to its first ever national drill meet. The drill team and color guard finished in the top five units in the country of over thirty schools participating.

Other Notable Events:

 1989 - Eunice Taylor became the first female corp commander.
 1991 - Frantz Petitpapa became the first African American corp commander.
 2008 - The Northeast Drill Team won second place in the Eastern Division National Drill Meet hosted by the Air Force Association in Macon, Georgia.

Athletics 

Northeast High School participates in the following sports:

 Baseball: Class 4A State Semi-finalist (1994)
 Basketball: Boys Class 3A State Runners-up (1985)
 Girls Basketball: Girls Class 6A State Runners-up (2016)
 Girls JV Basketball
 Cross Country
 Football - Current head coach is Nick Dellaria
 Golf
 Soccer
 Girls Soccer
 Softball
 Swimming: Girls Class 4A State Champions (1976)
 Tennis
 Track: Girls Class 3A State Champions (1984), Girls Class 3A 3rd place (2019)
 Volleyball: Boys State Runners-up (2004)
 Water Polo: Boys State Champions (2005, 2006)
 Wrestling

References 

Broward County Public Schools
High schools in Broward County, Florida
Public high schools in Florida
Magnet schools in Florida